William James Mitchell Jr. (born July 16, 1965) is an American video game player and restaurateur. He rose to national prominence in the 1980s when Life included him in a photo spread of game champions during the height of the golden age of arcade video games.

In 1999, Mitchell was the first person to claim a perfect score of 3,333,360 points on the arcade game Pac-Man. Twin Galaxies and Guinness World Records recognized Mitchell as the holder of several records on classic games including Pac-Man and Donkey Kong, and he has appeared in several documentaries on competitive gaming and retrogaming. A 2007 documentary, The King of Kong: A Fistful of Quarters, follows his attempts to maintain the highest score on Donkey Kong after being challenged by newcomer Steve Wiebe.

In 2018, Mitchell's high scores were contested after members of the Twin Galaxies forums found discrepancies in the videos Mitchell had provided for The King of Kong, suggesting he had used emulation software to falsify his score. Following a months-long investigation, Twin Galaxies concluded that some of Mitchell's high scores were not performed on original hardware as required by their rules, and invalidated all of his scores due to their zero-tolerance policy for dishonesty. Guinness likewise stripped Mitchell of his records. Following legal threats against Twin Galaxies and Guinness, Guinness reinstated Mitchell's records. Twin Galaxies, however, did not reverse its disqualifications, leading Mitchell to file defamation lawsuits against Twin Galaxies and others in 2020.

Mitchell's family owns the Rickey's restaurants in Hollywood, Florida, and Pembroke Pines, Florida, and he sells Rickey's World Famous Hot Sauce.

Biography

Early life and first records
Mitchell was born in Holyoke, Massachusetts, and grew up in South Florida.

In grade school, Mitchell became an avid pinball player. He was initially uninterested in video games, but as they became more popular, according to Mitchell, "[e]veryone was standing around the Donkey Kong machine and I wanted that attention". He began playing video games around age 16. His interest was also spurred by a friendly rivalry with a classmate, the two trying to outscore each other on both Pac-Man and Donkey Kong. Mitchell became curious whether Donkey Kong had a recorded world-record high score, and reached out to Walter Day at Twin Galaxies, at the time a single arcade in Ottumwa, Iowa, that had started tracking such records. Day told him of a record of 1.4 million claimed by Steve Sanders. In November 1982, Life brought several notable arcade players, including Mitchell and Sanders, to Ottumwa for a photoshoot. Mitchell challenged Sanders to Donkey Kong and demonstrated that the game had an impassable "kill screen" when he reached level 22, while subsequently beating Sanders and setting a high score of 874,300. Later, Sanders admitted that he had lied about his previous Donkey Kong scores, and Twin Galaxies gave the record to Billy Mitchell who held it for more than 18 years. Around this time, Mitchell established a friendship with Robert Childs, who had a business buying and installing arcade cabinets in places like laundromats.

He attended Chaminade-Madonna College Preparatory School in 1983. In 1983, Day invited Mitchell along with several other players from the photoshoot to participate in the "Electronic Circus", a 40-city tour where the players would demonstrate their skill at the arcade games at each stop. But the idea fell through, and Mitchell and others spent the summer months camping out at Twin Galaxies and competing for high scores on video games, with Mitchell focusing on only a few selected titles. Later that summer, Day founded the US National Video Game Team, a slimmer version of the Electronic Circus that aimed to make a stop in a major city in each US state, but the inaugural event had many snags. Day continued to bring Mitchell on various trips to confirm high scores reported by players, with Mitchell frequently calling out bluffs. By 1984, Day named Mitchell the Twin Galaxies' player of the year, but due to the 1983 video game crash, Twin Galaxies had to close down its storefront in March 1984, though it still tracked scores. After submitting a record score for BurgerTime in 1985, Mitchell moved away from video games for the next ten years, spending more time at his family's restaurant, Rickey's Restaurant, and eventually taking ownership of it.

Pac-Man challenge
Pac-Man was released in 1980. Players had discovered that it too had a type of kill screen: on reaching level 256, half the screen would be filled with nonsense glyphs that made it impossible to complete the level and continue. Following a 1982 claim made by an eight-year-old player of reaching more than 6 million points, which gained national coverage after President Ronald Reagan wrote to congratulate the player, Mitchell worked with his friend Chris Ayra in 1983 to determine that the highest possible score on Pac-Man was 3,333,360, which would require a perfect no-death run and collecting all possible points on the nonsense side of level 256's split-screen, requiring knowledge of where the edible dots were.

In 1999, a group of Canadian players, including Rick Fothergill, were reportedly close to reaching the theoretical high score, leading Mitchell to return to video gaming to try to beat this group to the achievement. On May 8, 1999, Fothergill set the world record, just 90 points short of a perfect score. In response, on July 3, Mitchell achieved the perfect score at an arcade in Laconia, New Hampshire, and set the game's world record as recorded by Funspot and Twin Galaxies. For this, Twin Galaxies named him  "Video Game Player of the Century", and Namco, the makers of Pac-Man, brought Mitchell to Japan for the Tokyo Game Show that year. After returning in November 1999, Mitchell offered $100,000 to the first person who could pass the split-screen level. The prize was not claimed by the January 1, 2000 deadline.

Return to gaming
In 2004, Mitchell achieved a Donkey Kong score of 933,900 in front of multiple witnesses at the Midwest Gaming Classic, his new personal best. Writing about Mitchell for the Oxford American in 2006, David Ramsey described Mitchell as "probably the greatest arcade video game player of all time". In 2004 and 2005, contender Steve Wiebe attempted to set a new world record in Donkey Kong, an event documented in the 2007 film The King of Kong: A Fistful of Quarters. Wiebe attempted to have Mitchell present at these events to challenge him directly, typically at Funspot arcades, as public demonstrations of high scores were preferred over video tape. Mitchell had said, "To me, most important is to travel to a sanctioned location, like Funspot, that makes it official; if tomorrow Tiger Woods golfs a 59, big deal. If he does it at Augusta, that's where it counts." Mitchell failed to appear at Wiebe's events, saying he had not played games for half a year and needed to retrain and practice for the competition.

During Wiebe's attempts, he achieved a score of more than one million points on an arcade unit at his home, which was recorded on videotape and initially accepted by Twin Galaxies but later retracted, since Wiebe's unit used an unofficial "Double Donkey Board" that had circuitry for both Donkey Kong and Donkey Kong Jr. Later in his attempts, Wiebe again managed a high score in front of multiple witnesses at a New Hampshire Funspot, which Twin Galaxies accepted. Just hours later, Mitchell submitted his own tape to Twin Galaxies which purported to show him achieving a new high score of 1,047,200, which bested Wiebe's score and which Twin Galaxies accepted as the new official world record. Wiebe and others at the New Hampshire location complained to Twin Galaxies, and eventually Mitchell's score was nullified due to being on tape rather than witnessed, giving Wiebe the record again. After the film's release, Mitchell said he had not expected to be portrayed as a bad person, and that he had received hate mail and badgering phone calls because of the way the film was edited. 
In addition to the King of Kong, Mitchell appears in several other documentaries during the 2000s and 2010s, including Chasing Ghosts: Beyond the Arcade (2007), The King of Arcades (2014), and Man vs Snake: The Long and Twisted Tale of Nibbler (2015).

On July 26, 2007, 25 years after Mitchell's first record-setting performance, Mitchell again retook the Donkey Kong record with a score of 1,050,200. This score was known as the "Mortgage Brokers" score, as it was made while Mitchell was attending the annual convention for the Florida Association of Mortgage Brokers.

The 2007 score was surpassed on February 26, 2010, by Hank Chien, who temporarily held the record. On July 24, 2010, Mitchell reclaimed the record with a score of 1,062,800 at the Boomers arcade in Dania, Florida. It was the last time he held the record after it was broken by Wiebe later that year and others since then.

Mitchell placed eighth out of eight in the Microsoft Xbox 360 Pac-Man World Championships on June 4, 2007. In 2008, he became the first video game player on a Topps Allen & Ginter trading card.

In 2015, Mitchell filed a lawsuit against Cartoon Network, saying that in Regular Show, a character who cheats at video games called Garrett Bobby Ferguson (GBF) infringed on his likeness. United States District Court for the District of New Jersey Judge Anne Elise Thompson threw out the lawsuit, saying that "the television character does not match the plaintiff in appearance".

Disputed records
In August 2017, Jeremy Young, a moderator of the Donkey Kong Forums, expressed concern related to a video posted online by Childs of Mitchell's Boomers score. Mitchell had played both Donkey Kong and Donkey Kong, Jr. that day, breaking records for both, but was using the same cabinet for it, with Childs having swapped the circuit board between the runs. The videos did not show the complete record-breaking runs, and Young believed there might have been issues with the board swap. Mitchell and Childs affirmed that some parts of the board-switching were staged, but that part of the recording was made well after the records had been set on legitimate hardware.

Young continued to investigate the Boomers video as well as the King of Kong and Mortgage Brokers scores, and in early 2018 posted evidence that both scores were made on MAME, an emulator, rather than actual hardware. Young subsequently removed the three scores from the Donkey Kong Forums website for misrepresenting MAME emulation as authentic gameplay. Young's statement was backed up by Wes Copeland, a former holder of the Donkey Kong high score. Based on analysis of the scoring rate and frequencies of the game, he concluded that Mitchell's run showed a statistically unlikely rate of scoring. Further, it was determined that the verifier for the Boomers and Mortgage Brokers scores was Twin Galaxies referee Todd Rogers, who had himself been banned from Twin Galaxies for submitting fraudulent scores, putting Mitchell's scores in doubt.

Mitchell defended his scores on the East Side Dave Show shortly after this charge, saying: "I've never even played MAME. I don’t have MAME loaded in my home." Mitchell added, "The film footage that he has, that Jeremy has, shows MAME play... I'm not disputing what he says. What I'm disputing is the fact that I want him to have the original tape." Mitchell also suggested that the tape footage Young had may have been fabricated. Young responded, "The amount of foresight, patience, and technical knowledge required would be staggering" to make such tapes. To support his case, Mitchell said he sent Twin Galaxies recordings of the gameplay from these high-score efforts along with other secondary evidence to deny any cheating.

On April 12, 2018, Twin Galaxies announced that an investigation conducted into Mitchell's submitted scores found conclusive evidence that Mitchell used an emulator for the footage of his two high scores. In particular, the footage of these two scores showed the game loading in a way that could not be reproduced on original hardware, but was visually identical to how the game loads when played on MAME. Twin Galaxies removed all of Mitchell's scores from their records and prohibited him from submitting scores in the future. Subsequently, Guinness World Records released a statement that it would remove Mitchell's scores: "The Guinness World Records titles relating to Mr. Mitchell's highest scores on Donkey Kong have all been disqualified due to Twin Galaxies being our source of verification for these achievements." The removal also includes Mitchell's Pac-Man high score and first recorded perfect game: "Twin Galaxies was the original source of verification for these record titles and in line with their decision to remove all of Mr. Mitchell's records from their system, we have disqualified Mr. Mitchell as the holder of these two records."

Mitchell challenged these removals and threatened to sue both Twin Galaxies and Guinness if they did not restore his records. At the encouragement of his son, Mitchell used Twitch to broadcast scores equal to his past records. The situation between Mitchell and Twin Galaxies also created tension between Mitchell and several of his friends and acquaintances in the video game community. In early 2019, Mitchell filed lawsuits against Twin Galaxies as well as Young and YouTuber Apollo Legend. After a judge ruled against Twin Galaxies' attempt to dismiss the case under California's anti-SLAPP laws, Twin Galaxies filed a counterclaim against Mitchell and Walter Day in late 2020, alleging that they defrauded Twin Galaxies's current owners by selling the site's assets with the knowledge that the database contained fake scores, thus reducing its reputation and therefore its monetary value. In October 2021, a U.S. appeals court allowed Mitchell's suit against Twin Galaxies to proceed.

Guinness World Records announced in June 2020 that after review, it could not find conclusive proof that Mitchell had used improper methods to achieve his high scores, and restored both Mitchell's Donkey Kong and Pac-Man records. Mitchell told Ars Technica that Guinness had made the decision back in December 2019, but due to agreements related to prior legal actions he had against Guinness, they could not announce it until June 2020. Mitchell also said that his legal threats towards Guinness did not affect Guinness's decision to reinstate his records. In 2021 and 2022, Mitchell filed two lawsuits against YouTuber and speedrunner Karl Jobst, saying that two of his videos were defamatory, one of them using a clip that refers to Mitchell as a cheater, the other covering his cheating allegations.

In September 2022, forensic analyst Tanner Fokkens and five other experts published a report finding that, after technical analysis of his gameplay, Mitchell could not have obtained his records on original arcade hardware, the stage-to-stage transitions being consistent with those in MAME. Photographs from the 2007 Florida Association of Mortgage Brokers convention uncovered in January 2023 showed that the Donkey Kong cabinet Mitchell used there appeared to have a modified joystick that allowed for eight-way motion rather than the standard four-way joystick. This would be in violation of Twin Galaxies' rules against playing on modified hardware.

In January 2023, Jobst made a video that showcased evidence in the form of an old photograph that clearly demonstrated that Mitchell did not play his claimed world record runs on original hardware despite claiming so for many years. In addition, the 8-direction joystick (as opposed the original 4-direction joystick) would have made the game much easier to play. Jobst had previously been sued twice by Mitchell, with one claim seeking $450,000 in damages for defamation. Jobst had already spent about $180,000 on legal fees, and he had estimated a further $100,000 in legal costs to defend himself; all three lawsuits were dismissed. Jobst set up a legal defence fund on GoFundMe to mitigate the financial damage to his family due to the lawsuit. As of February 2023, it has raised US$144,279.

The lawsuits against Jobst and others have been considered by presiding judges and media commentators to be frivolous, if not downright vexatious.

Personal life
Mitchell has three children and lives with his wife in Weston, Florida.

Notable scores
Mitchell set high-score records on several games in the 1980s and 1990s. Since his initial high score in Donkey Kong in 1982 and return to record-breaking attempts between 2004 and 2010, others have matched or surpassed Mitchell's scores. Due to Twin Galaxies disqualifying all of Mitchell's scores, none of these records are considered valid by Twin Galaxies.

 In 1982, Mitchell set a record on Donkey Kong with 874,300 points.
 In mid-1983, he and Chris Ayra reached the split-screen level 256 of Pac-Man. In 1999, Mitchell said he was the first player to achieve a perfect score of 3,333,360 points.
 In 1984, he set a record score for BurgerTime of 7,881,050, which stood until 2005.
 In January 1985, he set a new record score for Ms. Pac-Man of 703,560, which stood until it was surpassed in 2001 by Ayra.
 On July 8, 1985, he became the fifth person to achieve a score on Centipede of more than 10 million points in marathon play.
 He set a record score for Donkey Kong Jr. of 957,300 in 2004.
 He said he recaptured the world records for both Donkey Kong (1,062,800 points) and Donkey Kong Jr. (1,270,900) on the weekend of July 24, 2010. In 2015, both these records were surpassed. The Donkey Kong record was removed by the Donkey Kong Forum in February 2018, which prompted Twin Galaxies to remove the records in April 2018 after an investigation ruled Mitchell did not use an original unmodified version of the Donkey Kong arcade hardware but an emulator or other disallowed means. Evidence was presented that the score was falsified. However, Guinness World Records reversed their decision and reinstated Billy Mitchell's previous world records.

Honors
On January 14, 1984, Mitchell was selected as one of the 1983 "Video Game Players of the Year" by Twin Galaxies and the U.S. National Video Game Team.

On June 21, 2006, MTV selected Mitchell as one of "The 10 Most Influential Video Gamers of All Time".

References

Further reading
 
 
 Details of Jeremy Young's analysis of Mitchell's gameplay tapes

External links

 
 

1965 births
2018 controversies in the United States
American esports players
Donkey Kong players
Living people
People from Hollywood, Florida
People from Springfield, Massachusetts
Video game controversies
Chaminade-Madonna College Preparatory School alumni